The 11th Robert Awards ceremony was held in 1994 in Copenhagen, Denmark. Organized by the Danish Film Academy, the awards honoured the best in Danish and foreign film of 1993.

Honorees

Best Danish Film 
 The House of the Spirits – Bille August

Best Screenplay 
 Bille August – The House of the Spirits

Best Actor in a Leading Role 
 Frits Helmuth – Stolen Spring

Best Actress in a Leading Role 
 Sofie Gråbøl – Black Harvest

Best Actor in a Supporting Role 
 Jesper Christensen – Den russiske sangerinde

Best Actress in a Supporting Role 
 Anne Marie Helger –

Best Cinematography 
 Jan Weincke – Black Harvest

Production Design 
 Gunilla Allard – Black Harvest

Best Costume Design 
 Manon Rasmussen – Black Harvest

Best Makeup 
  & Anne Cathrine Sauerberg – Black Harvest

Best Sound Design 
 Niels Arild – The House of the Spirits

Best Editing 
  - The House of the Spirits

Best Score 
 Anders Koppel & Hans-Henrik Ley – Jungledyret Hugo

Best Documentary Short 
 En skæv start & To år med Randi – Anja Dalhoff

Best Foreign Film 
 The Piano – Jane Campion

See also 

 1994 Bodil Awards

References

External links 
  

1993 film awards
1994 in Denmark
Robert Awards ceremonies
1990s in Copenhagen